John Mulhall (18 August 1938 – 6 August 2022) was a British gymnast. He competed at the 1960 Summer Olympics and the 1964 Summer Olympics.

References

1938 births
2022 deaths
British male artistic gymnasts
Olympic gymnasts of Great Britain
Gymnasts at the 1960 Summer Olympics
Gymnasts at the 1964 Summer Olympics
Sportspeople from Cardiff